Niles Eugene Welch (July 29, 1888 – November 21, 1976) was an American performer on Broadway, and a leading man in a number of silent and early talking motion pictures from the early 1910s through the 1930s.

Early life
A native of Hartford, Connecticut, after graduating from St. Paul's School, Welch attended Yale and Columbia University. Later he joined a stock company, and from there toured the U.S. in vaudeville. The first film he worked in was The Stranger in Grey with the Eastern Vitagraph Studios.

Career
After spending four years on the legitimate stage, Welch started his screen career appearing with World Film Corporation, Universal, Pathé Studios and Goldwyn Pictures. Among his earliest works were two Thomas Ince productions, Stepping Out and The Cup of Life, followed in rapid succession by Miss George Washington, with Marguerite Clark; The Courage of Marge O'Doone, with Pauline Starke; and with Grace Darmond in The Gulf Between (1917), the first feature film produced in the two-strip version of Technicolor. His career continued well into the sound era but mainly in bit roles.

Welch was the announcer for Columbia's American School of the Air on CBS radio in 1939. During World War II, he made foreign-language broadcasts for the Voice of America (VOA), using his fluency in French and German. He had his own program on VOA in addition to participating in daily broadcasts on the short-wave broadcasts to Europe. In 1945, a door at the VOA studio in New York hit Welch on his forehead, causing both retinas to detach. He lost sight in one eye and had partial vision in the other eye for one year, after which he became totally blind.

On Broadway, Welch portrayed David Cornish in The Donovan Affair (1926).

Personal life and death
Welch was married to actress Elaine Baker. He died in Laguna Niguel, California, on November 21, 1976, at age 88.

Selected filmography

 One Good Joke Deserves Another (1913, Short)
 Love's Quarantine (1913, Short) - False Policeman
 The Carpenter (1913, Short)
 The Only Way (1913, Short)
 Our Wives (1913, Short) - Stanton
 A Royal Family (1915)
 Emmy of Stork's Nest (1915) - Benton Cabot
 A Yellow Streak (1915) - Tom Austin
 Merely Mary Ann (1916)
 The Kiss of Hate (1916, *lost film) - Paul Turgeneff
 The Crucial Test (1916, *lost film) - Vance Holden
 Behind the Veil (1916, Short) - Wilbur Steele
 The Garden of Shadows (1916, Short) - The Father
 Miss George Washington (1916, *lost film) - Cleverley Trafton
 One of Many (1917) - Harold Templeton
 The Gulf Between (1917, *lost film, only very short fragments survive) - Richard Farrell
 The Secret of the Storm Country (1917, *lost film) - Frederick Graves
 Shame (1917) - Donald Strong
 The Gates of Gladness (1918) - Myron Leeds
 Her Boy (1918, *lost film) - David Morrison
 The Face in the Dark (1918) - Richard Grant
 Jane Goes A-Wooing (1919, *lost film) - Monty Lyman
 The Winning Girl (1919, *lost film) - Stanley Templeton
 Reclaimed: The Struggle for a Soul Between Love and Hate (1919) - Frank Truman
 Little Comrade (1919, *lost film) - Bobbie Hubbard
 The Law of Men (1919, *lost film) - Denis Connors
 The Virtuous Thief (1919, *lost film) - Bobbie Baker
 Stepping Out (1919, *unknown/presumably lost) - Robert Hillary
 Beckoning Roads (1919) - Humphrey Wells
 The Luck of Geraldine Laird (1920, *lost film) - Dean Laird
 The Courage of Marge O'Doone (1920, *lost film) - David Raine
 The Spenders (1921) - P. Percival Bines
 Reputation (1921, *lost film) - Jimmie Dorn
 Who Am I? (1921) - Jimmy Weaver
 The Cup of Life (1921) - Roy Bradley or Warren Bradford
 Remorseless Love (1921) - Enoch Morrison
 The Sin of Martha Queed (1921) - Arnold Barry
 The Way of a Maid (1921) - Thomas Lawlor
 Why Announce Your Marriage? (1922) - Jimmy Winthrop
 Reckless Youth (1922) - John Carmen
 Evidence (1922) - Phillip Rowland
 Under Oath (1922) - Hartley Peters
 Rags to Riches (1922) - Dumbbell - aka Ralph Connor
 Who Are My Parents? (1922) - Ken (her son)
 What Wives Want (1923) - David Loring
 Sawdust (1923) - Phillip Lessoway
 The Six-Fifty (1923, *lost film) - Mark Rutherford
 The Whispered Name (1924) - John Manning
 My Man (1924) - Dicky Reynolds
 The Right of the Strongest (1924) - Austin Jr.
 Wine of Youth (1924) - Robert (1897 prologue)
 Virtue's Revolt (1924) - Steve Marbridge
 Dangerous Pleasure (1924) - Alan Gordon
 Scandal Street (1925) - Neil Keenly / Harrison Halliday
 Fear-Bound (1925) - Tod Vane
 The Girl on the Stairs (1925) - Frank Farrell
 Lying Wives (1925) - Wallace Graham Jr
 A Little Girl in a Big City (1925) - Jack McGuire
 Ermine and Rhinestones (1925) - Billy Kershaw
 The Substitute Wife (1925) - Lawrence Sinton
 In Borrowed Plumes (1926) - Philip Dean
 The Virgin Wife (1926) - Thomas Lattimer
 The Men Women Love (1926) - Keith
 Faithful Wives (1926) - Charles Austin
 Spider Webs (1927) - Bert Grantland
 Carry on, Sergeant! (1928, Canadian) - Donald Cameron
 Hell Divers (1931) - Lt. Commander Standing Next to Captain (uncredited)
 The Phantom (1931) - Sam Crandall
 Convicted (1931) - Roy Fenton
 Manhattan Parade (1931) - Frank Harriman (uncredited)
 The Rainbow Trail (1932) - Willets
 Cross-Examination (1932) - Warren Slade
 Border Devils (1932) - Tom Hope
 The Famous Ferguson Case (1932) - Jeff Haines—Reporter (uncredited)
 Cornered (1932) - Moody Pierson
 McKenna of the Mounted (1932) - Morgan
 The Night Club Lady (1932) - Dr. Baldwin (uncredited)
 Come On, Tarzan (1932) - Steve Frazier
 A Scarlet Week-End (1932) - The Wife's Former Fiancée
 Silver Dollar (1932) - Congressman William Jennings Bryan (uncredited)
 Sundown Rider (1932) - Houseman - Banker
 The Mysterious Rider (1933) - John Foster
 The Constant Woman (1933) - Hotel Clerk (uncredited)
 Zoo in Budapest (1933) - Mr. Vandor
 The Lone Avenger (1933) - Martin Carter
 Dangerous Crossroads (1933) - Gang Member
 The Wolf Dog (1933) - Mason
 The Women in His Life (1933) - Pinball Spectator (uncredited)
 Let's Fall in Love (1933) - Archie Frost (uncredited)
 The Fighting Code (1933) - Crosby (uncredited)
 Massacre (1934) - Arena Announcer (uncredited)
 This Side of Heaven (1934) - Druggist (uncredited)
 The Show-Off (1934) - Ship #2 Officer (uncredited)
 I Believed in You (1934) - Painter (uncredited)
 Cross Streets (1934) - Jerry Clement
 Whom the Gods Destroy (1934) - Forrester Associate (uncredited)
 We're Rich Again (1934) - Guest on Yacht (uncredited)
 Here Comes the Navy (1934) - USS Arizona Officer (uncredited)
 The Count of Monte Cristo (1934) - De Villefort's Agent (uncredited)
 Tomorrow's Youth (1934) - Mr. Hall's Attorney
 Jealousy (1934) - Police Doctor (uncredited)
 The Secret Bride (1934) - Senate Clerk (uncredited)
 Death Flies East (1935) - Simpson (uncredited)
 Living on Velvet (1935) - Major's Aide (uncredited)
 Stone of Silver Creek (1935) - Rev. Timothy Tucker
 The Miracle Rider (1935) - Metzger
 Air Hawks (1935) - McCoy - Dispatcher (uncredited)
 Stranded (1935) - Safety Engineer (uncredited)
 Riding Wild (1935) - Clay Stevens
 Shipmates Forever (1935) - Naval Academy Entrance Examiner (uncredited)
 Music Is Magic (1935) - Film Director (uncredited)
 The Ivory-Handled Gun (1935) - Pat Moore as a young man
 The Singing Vagabond (1935) - Judge Forsythe Lane
 The Story of Louis Pasteur (1935) - Courier with Letter (uncredited)
 Wife vs. Secretary (1936) - Tom Axel (uncredited)
 Foolproof (1936, Short) - John Harwood
 The First Baby (1936) - Father in Park (uncredited)
 Gentle Julia (1936) - Book Salesman (uncredited)
 The Country Beyond (1936) - Party Guest (uncredited)
 For the Service (1936) - Parson (uncredited)
 Mary of Scotland (1936) - Minor Role (uncredited)
 To Mary – with Love (1936) - Secretary
 What Becomes of the Children? (1936) - Thomas Scott
 Empty Saddles (1936) - Jasper Kade
 Thirst Aid (1937, Short) - Nails Dolan
 The Purple Vigilantes (1938)
 Boy in Court (1940, Short) - Narrator (final film role)

References

 The New York Times
 Silent Gents
 Niles Welch portrait NY Public Library (Rose Collection)

External links

 
 

American male film actors
American male silent film actors
American male stage actors
Vaudeville performers
Male actors from Hartford, Connecticut
1888 births
1976 deaths
Yale University alumni
Columbia University alumni
20th-century American male actors
Burials at Pacific View Memorial Park